Sant'Egidio del Monte Albino s a town and comune in the province of Salerno in the Campania region of southern Italy. The town is commonly known also in the abbreviated naming form of Sant'Egidio Montalbino.

Geography
Located at the feet of the Monti Lattari, the town is bordered by Angri, Corbara, Pagani, San Marzano sul Sarno and Tramonti.

History
In Roman times, villas and an aqueduct were built in this area.

In the 8th century, the nocerini who had escaped from Nuceria Alfaterna took refuge there and the monks founded the Abbey of San Nicola and Sant'Egidio, which later became Santa Maddalena in Armillis.

From the 15th century it was known as Universitas Sanctii Ægidii, part of Nocera dei Pagani, at the end of the 16th century the city of Corbara separated from it and became an autonomous university. In 1806 the municipality of Sant'Egidio was born. In 1928 it was, for a few years, a fraction of the municipality of Angri.

The poet and composer Aniello Califano was from Sant'Egidio, who wrote the famous song 'O surdato 'nnammurato.

Main sights

Sights include the so-called Fonte Helvius, a Roman marble slab portraying the god Sarnus: it contains a fountain fed by an ancient subterranean aqueduct.

See also
Chiunzi

References

External links

Cities and towns in Campania